is a former Japanese football player.

Club career
Oki was born in Matsuyama on February 23, 1976. After dropped out from Aoyama Gakuin University, he joined Sanfrecce Hiroshima in 1995. However he could not play in many matches, he moved to J2 League club Oita Trinita in 2000. He returned to Sanfrecce in 2001. From 2001, he played many matches. In 2006, he could hardly play in the match for injury and moved to his local club Ehime FC in 2007. He played many matches in young team. From 2010, his opportunity to play decreased and retired end of 2012 season.

National team career
In April 1995, Oki was selected Japan U-20 national team for 1995 World Youth Championship. He played all 4 matches and scored a goal against Chile in first match.

Club statistics

References

External links

1976 births
Living people
Aoyama Gakuin University alumni
Association football people from Ehime Prefecture
Japanese footballers
Japan youth international footballers
J1 League players
J2 League players
Sanfrecce Hiroshima players
Oita Trinita players
Ehime FC players
Association football forwards